Edward Waring was a mathematician.

Edward Waring may also refer to:

Edward John Waring (1819–1891), British surgeon
Edward Waring (MP) for Bishop's Castle
Eddie Waring (1910–1986), British rugby league football coach, commentator and television presenter